Yoon Jong-gyu (born 20 March 1998) is a South Korean football defender who plays for Gimcheon Sangmu and the South Korea national team.

Club career 
He joined FC Seoul in 2017.

International career 
He was part of the South Korea U-17 squad at the 2015 FIFA U-17 World Cup.

He was part of the South Korea U-20 squad at the 2017 FIFA U-20 World Cup.

He was part of the South Korea squad at the 2022 EAFF E-1 Football Championship.

Career statistics

Club
As of 30 October 2022

Honours

International
South Korea U23
AFC U-23 Championship: 2020

References

External links 

1998 births
Living people
Association football defenders
South Korean footballers
Gyeongnam FC players
FC Seoul players
K League 1 players
K League 2 players
South Korea under-20 international footballers
South Korea under-23 international footballers
South Korea international footballers
2022 FIFA World Cup players